This is a list of all devices running Microsoft's Windows Phone 8.1 operating system.

In addition to existing Windows Phone 8 partners HTC, Samsung and Huawei, Gionee, JSR, Karbonn, LG, Lenovo, Longcheer, XOLO, and ZTE signed on to create Windows Phone 8.1 devices in early 2014. Miia, Micromax, Prestigio, Yezz, BLU, K-Touch and InFocus were subsequently named as hardware partners later on in the year.

Nokia's devices division was acquired by Microsoft in early 2014 and has since been rebranded as Microsoft Mobile.  Microsoft Mobile continued to release Nokia-branded handsets running Windows Phone until a clearer strategy for aligning the Microsoft and Nokia brands was decided on in October 2014. This was to replace the Nokia name on future Lumia devices with Microsoft Lumia branding. The first device released without Nokia branding was the Lumia 535.

Devices

Dual-core 480p 
Devices feature a dual core processor, 480p screen with 480x800 resolution and a microSD card reader.

Quad-core 480p 
These devices feature quad core processors, 480p screens with 480x800 or 480x854 resolution and microSD card readers. The devices use Snapdragon 200, 400 or 410 processors.

Quad-core 540p
The Microsoft Lumia 535 features a quad core Snapdragon 200 processor, qHD screen at 540x960 resolution and a microSD card reader.

Quad-core 720p 
These devices feature quad core processors, 720p screens at 720x1280 resolution and microSD card readers. The devices use Snapdragon 200, 400 or 410 processors.

Quad-core 1080p 
These devices feature quad core processors and 1080p screens at 1080x1920 resolution. The Nokia Lumia 930 lacks a microSD card reader and uses a Snapdragon 800 chipset, while the HTC One (M8) with Windows Phone features a card reader and uses a Snapdragon 801 chipset.

See also 
 Windows Phone version history
 Windows Phone 8.1
 List of Windows Phone 8 devices
 List of Windows 10 Mobile devices

References

 
Technology-related lists
Lists of mobile phones